Paolo Frangipane (born 11 July 1979 in Buenos Aires) is an Argentine former football midfielder.

Career 
He made his professional debut in 1996, with Deportivo Español of Argentina in an away match against Argentinos Juniors, which they lost 1-0. He was brought to Deportivo Cali in 2007, by then-manager, Omar Labruna of Argentina.

He came to CFR Cluj from the Argentine sports club Belgrano on 9 January 2009.

After playing professionally in Argentina, Greece, Romania and Chile, Frangipane signed with Colombia's Deportes Tolima in January 2012.

In October 2012 he joined the Indonesia Super League clubs, Mitra Kukar.

References

External links

1979 births
Living people
Argentine footballers
Argentine expatriate footballers
Deportivo Español footballers
Club Atlético Tigre footballers
Club Atlético Los Andes footballers
Gimnasia y Esgrima de Jujuy footballers
Club Atlético Belgrano footballers
Aldosivi footballers
Deportivo Cali footballers
C.D. Huachipato footballers
CFR Cluj players
Deportes Tolima footballers
Chilean Primera División players
Categoría Primera A players
Liga I players
Expatriate footballers in Chile
Expatriate footballers in Colombia
Expatriate footballers in Romania
Footballers from Buenos Aires
Association football midfielders
Huracán de Tres Arroyos footballers
Expatriate footballers in Indonesia
Mitra Kukar players
Liga 1 (Indonesia) players